Westerpark is a former borough (stadsdeel) just northwest of the centre of the city of Amsterdam, Netherlands.
As a borough it existed from 1990 till 2010, when it merged with the boroughs Oud-West, Bos en Lommer and De Baarsjes to form the new borough Amsterdam-West.

Westerpark comprised the following neighborhoods and areas:
 Frederik Hendrikbuurt
 Houthaven (former harbour area)
 Spaarndammerbuurt
 Staatsliedenbuurt
 Waterwijk
 Zeeheldenbuurt
 Westerpark (neighborhood) proper including the Westerpark (park)

Amsterdam-West
Former boroughs of Amsterdam